Lophiotoma leucotropis, common name the light-wine turrid, is a species of sea snail, a marine gastropod mollusk in the family Turridae, the turrids.

Description
The length of the shell varies between 35 mm and 75 mm.

The fusiform shell is slightly swollen in the middle. It contains 11 whorls with fine striae. The whorls are concave above and acutely carinated. The lower part of the body whorl is bicarinate and has a wide sinus. This species is distinguished by the broad slanting concavity round the upper part of the whorls, and its prominent central keel.

Distribution
This marine species occurs off the Philippines; in the Yellow Sea, East China Sea and South China Sea; and off and Japan.

References

 Knudsen J. (1992). Preliminary list of common marine prosobranch gastropods (Mollusca) from Hoi Ha Wan. In: Morton B, editor. Proceedings of the Fourth International Marine Biological Workshop: The Marine Flora and Fauna of Hong Kong and Southern China. The marine flora and fauna of Hong Kong and southern China III. Hong Kong University Press, Hong Kong. 2: pp 919-921
 Liu, J.Y. [Ruiyu] (ed.). (2008). Checklist of marine biota of China seas. China Science Press. 1267 pp.

External links

  Picardal, Rafael M., and Roger G. Dolorosa. "The molluscan fauna (gastropods and bivalves) and notes on environmental conditions of two adjoining protected bays in Puerto Princesa City, Palawan, Philippines." Journal of Entomology and Zoology Studies 2.5 (2014): 72-90.
 Taylor, John D. "TURRINAE, CLAVATULINAE AND CRASSISPIRINAE (GASTROPODA: CONOIDEA) FROM HONG KONG."

leucotropis
Gastropods described in 1850